GCO may refer to:

 Gemini Air Cargo, a defunct American cargo airline
 Genesco, an American footwear retailer
 GeorgiaCarry.org, an American gun rights organization
 Gotham Chamber Opera, a defunct American opera company
 Graphics and Calligraphy Office, a unit of the Social Office at the White House
 Grande ceinture Ouest, a section of the Grande Ceinture de Paris
 Ground communication outlet, a system installed at some U.S. airports